Laryngo-onycho-cutaneous syndrome (also known as Shabbir syndrome) is a rare epithelial disorder inherited in an autosomal recessive fashion. It is characterized by abnormalities in the larynx, nails ("onycho-"), and skin ("cutaneous"). The disorder is only found in Punjabi Muslims and only a few cases have been reported.

It was characterized by Pakistani dermatologist Syed Ghulam Shabbir (1923–2002) in 1986.

It may be associated with LAMA3.

See also 
 Watson syndrome
 List of cutaneous conditions

References

External links 

 Laryngo-onycho-cutaneous syndrome on MedlinePlus

Genodermatoses
Syndromes affecting the skin